Helladius and Theophilus were two Christian martyrs in Libya, killed by being thrown into a furnace. Helladius was a layman and Theophilus a deacon. The Roman Martyrology gives their feast as 8 January.

Sources
http://www.catholic.org/saints/saint.php?saint_id=2268
http://www.santiebeati.it/dettaglio/36620

Christian saints
Christian martyrs
Saints duos